Banyuwangi, previously known as Banjoewangi, is the administrative capital of Banyuwangi Regency at the far eastern end of the island of Java, Indonesia. It had a population of 106,000 at the 2010 Census and 117,558 at the 2020 Census.

The town is also known as city of festival as many festivals are held throughout the year. Banyuwangi Regency is a tourist destination, and additional developments have been proposed to encourage international tourism by building necessary infrastructures.

Geography
Banyuwangi (the name meaning "Fragrant Water", after a mythical river) is built in the centre of the east coast of Java, with the backdrop of the Ijen Plateau to the west, and with fine views across the Bali Strait (Selat Bali) to the island of Bali lying to the east. The principal market area is along the Jalan Susuit Tuban, the street which links the town square (or alun-alun) with the sports stadium (Stadium Diponegoro) a half-kilometre to the southeast.

History
The city was the capital of the Kingdom of Blambangan, the sixteenth-century Hindu kingdom which ruled this eastern tip of Java. Although the rapidly expanding Muslim kingdom of Mataram attacked Blambangan during the early seventeenth century, it managed to survive as the last Hindu kingdom on the island, and it was mostly ignored by the Dutch until the eighteenth century, when they took it over.

Banyuwangi was where the undersea cable connected to Darwin, Australia, where it met the Australian Overland Telegraph Line in November 1871.

Transportation
Banyuwangi International Airport at Blimbingsari serves the Regency (including Banyuwangi town) and the surrounding area in East Java.

References

External links

 

 
Districts of East Java
Regency seats of East Java
Populated coastal places in Indonesia